Calvin Joseph Johnson is an American film stuntman and stunt coordinator and film actor, who has been a stunt double for many of Hollywood's A-list actors.

He now has over 300 credits in major motion pictures, TV, commercials and videos, like The Last Song and many others.

References

External links

American stunt performers
Living people
Male actors from Kansas
Actors from Wichita, Kansas
American male film actors
American male television actors
Year of birth missing (living people)
20th-century American male actors
21st-century American male actors